Xenodusa cava is a species of rove beetle in the family Staphylinidae. It is found in North America. It is myrmecophilic, with its larvae living in ant colonies, begging for food and consuming ant larvae.

References

Further reading

External links

 

Aleocharinae
Articles created by Qbugbot
Beetles described in 1863